A referendum on political control of Radiotelevizija Slovenija was held in Slovenia on 25 September 2005. Voters were asked whether they approved of increasing political control of the country's public broadcaster. The proposal was approved by 50.7% of voters, although voter turnout was only 30.7%.

Results

References

2005 referendums
Referendums in Slovenia
2005 in Slovenia
September 2005 events in Europe